Clare Woods  (born 1972) is a British artist who lives and works in London and the Welsh borders. Some of her works are on a very large scale; one commissioned for the Olympic Delivery Authority in London is 83 metres long.

Woods completed an MA in Fine Art at Goldsmiths College, London in 1999, following a BA in Fine Art at Bath College of Art in 1994.

Collections
Woods’ paintings are held in many major national and international collections including the Arts Council Collection, London, British Council Collection, London,  Southampton City Art Gallery, National Museum Wales Collection,  Arken Museum of Modern Art, Denmark, and the Albright-Knox Museum, Buffalo, USA.

Exhibitions

Woods’ work has been the subject solo exhibitions including, 
 The New Art Centre, Salisbury, UK (2008)
 The Hepworth Wakefield, UK (2011) 
 Harewood House, Leeds, UK (2013) 
 Rebecca Camhi Gallery, Athens (2014)
 Oriel Davies Gallery, Wales (2014) 
 Plas Glyn-y-Weddw, Wales (2015) 
 Martin Asbaek Gallery, Copenhagen (2015) 
Clare Wooods, Hanging Hollow and Holes, Buchmann Galerie, Berlin (2015)
 Clare Woods, Reality Dimmed, Mead Gallery, Warwick Arts Centre, Coventry UK (2018)
Clare Woods, If not now, then when, Buchmann Galerie, Berlin (2020)

Commissions
Woods received a major commission from Contemporary Art Society/ Olympic Delivery Authority to create two permanent pieces of work, Carpenter's Curve and Brick Field, for the Olympic Park, London in 2012.

Other major commissions include, Future City/Make Architects commission for a building, London (2005–07), Transport for London, Permanent Commission for Hampstead Heath Train Station London (2010–11), Worcester University/ Worcester County Council, Large Scale painting for the new Hive building (2012) Art on the Underground, River Services commission two new paintings for a poster commission (2014), Large Scale Painting Commission, VIA University College, Denmark (2015).

Woods also works in print and has had print commissions from Habitat, Counter Editions, Sidney Nolan Trust / The Hepworth Wakefield, Edition Copenhagen, Harewood House and Alan Cristea Gallery, London. In 2014 Woods produced a poster design, Cranky, part of a series commissioned by Art on the Underground for London River Services.

References

1972 births
Living people
20th-century English women artists
21st-century English women artists
20th-century English painters
21st-century English painters
Alumni of Bath School of Art and Design
Alumni of Goldsmiths, University of London
English contemporary artists
English women painters
Artists from Southampton